Cyclopalpia violescens is a species of snout moth in the genus Cyclopalpia. It was described by George Hampson 1897, and is known from the Brazilian state of São Paulo.

References

Moths described in 1897
Chrysauginae